BA6 may refer to:

 BA6, a postcode district in the BA postcode area
 BA-6, an armored car developed in the Soviet Union in the 1930s
 Brodmann area 6, a part of the frontal cortex in human brain